Albertisia is a genus of flowering plants belonging to the family Menispermaceae.

Its native range is Tropical and Southern Africa, Tropical and Subtropical Asia.

Species:

Albertisia apiculata 
Albertisia capituliflora 
Albertisia cordifolia 
Albertisia crassa 
Albertisia cuneata 
Albertisia delagoensis 
Albertisia exelliana 
Albertisia ferruginea 
Albertisia glabra 
Albertisia laurifolia 
Albertisia mangenotii 
Albertisia mecistophylla 
Albertisia megacarpa 
Albertisia papuana 
Albertisia porcata 
Albertisia puberula 
Albertisia scandens 
Albertisia triplinervis 
Albertisia undulata 
Albertisia villosa

References

Menispermaceae
Menispermaceae genera